The Afghanistan women's national under-20 football team is the national under-20 team of Afghanistan that represents the Afghanistan in international football competitions including the CAFA U-20 Women's Championship, the AFC U-19 Women's Championship and the FIFA U-20 Women's World Cup, as well as any other under-20 international football tournaments. The team is governed by the Afghanistan Football Federation and is a member of the Asian Football Confederation (AFC).

History

Players

Fixtures and results
legend

2021

Competitive record

FIFA U-20 Women's World Cup

*Draws include knock-out matches decided on penalty kicks.

AFC U-20 Women's Asian Cup

*Draws include knock-out matches decided on penalty kicks.

AFC U-20 Women's Asian Cup qualification

CAFA U-20 Women's Championship

*Draws include knock-out matches decided on penalty kicks.

References

under-20
Asian women's national under-20 association football teams
under-20
Women's under-20